Jamie Love may refer to:

 Jamie Love (activist) (born 1995), LGBT activist
 James Love (NGO director) (born 1950), director of Knowledge Ecology International
 Jamie Love (softball) (born 1990), New Zealand softball player

See also
 James Love (disambiguation)